Gunton railway station on the Bittern Line in Norfolk, England, serves the villages of Lower Street, Thorpe Market and Southrepps.

There is no village named Gunton: the station is in the parish of Thorpe Market and closest to Lower Street. It was built primarily for the convenience of Lord Suffield, who lived at nearby Gunton Hall, a major investor in the original East Norfolk Railway which built the line from Norwich to Cromer.

The station is unstaffed and consists of a single platform with a basic shelter. Originally the location of a passing loop, the northbound platform and station buildings are preserved but now privately owned. There is an unrestricted car park at the station that can accommodate about ten vehicles.

The station is managed by Greater Anglia, which also operates all passenger trains that call.

Services

, the typical off-peak service at Gunton is one train every two hours in each direction between Norwich and Sheringham. At peak times, service frequency is increased to one train per hour. All services are operated by bi-mode Class 755 units.

References

External links 

Railway stations in Norfolk
DfT Category F2 stations
Former Great Eastern Railway stations
Railway stations in Great Britain opened in 1876
Greater Anglia franchise railway stations